BTRX-335140, also known by its other developmental code names BTRX-140, CYM-53093, and NMRA-140, is an opioid antagonist medication which is under development for the treatment of depression. It is specifically a selective κ-opioid receptor antagonist and is under development for major depressive disorder. As of February 2020, BTRX-335140 is in phase 2 clinical trials for this indication.

See also
 κ-Opioid receptor § Antagonists
 List of investigational antidepressants

References

External links
 BTRX 335140 - AdisInsight

Amines
Antidepressants
Experimental drugs
Fluoroarenes
Kappa-opioid receptor antagonists
Oxadiazoles
Piperidines
Quinolines
Synthetic opioids
Tetrahydropyrans